Fernanda Porto, or Maria Fernanda Dutra Clemente (Serra Negra, Brazil, December 31, 1965), is a Brazilian drum 'n' bossa singer. Drum 'n' bossa is a combination of electronic music, bossa nova and drum 'n' bass. Along with DJ Patife, her song "Sambassim" became popular in Brazil and many countries in Europe. DJ Marky later remixed it. Another song remixed was "Só Tinha Ser Com Você". She has also worked with American pop music producer Mark Holiday from Miami (also known as Trendsetter).

Discography
 2002 - Fernanda Porto
 2004 - Giramundo
 2006 - The Best Of Fernanda Porto
 2006 - Ao Vivo (Live)
 2009 - Auto Retrato

Appears on
 2001 - Cool Steps
 2001 - Sambaloco

Soundtrack
 2006 - Cabra Cega

References

External links
  Official Site 
  Official Fan Club

1965 births
Living people
21st-century Brazilian women singers
21st-century Brazilian singers
Brazilian drum and bass musicians
Women in Latin music